Robotropolis is a science-fiction action adventure film written and directed by Christopher Hatton and starring Zoe Naylor, Graham Sibley and Edward Foy.

Synopsis
A group of reporters are covering the unveiling of a new facility that is completely maintained by robot prototypes. When one of the robots goes haywire, the reporters find themselves not just reporting on the malfunction, but fighting for their lives.

Cast
Zoe Naylor as Christiane Nouveau
Graham Sibley as Danny Ross
Edward Foy as Jason Brooks
Lani John Tupu as Gordon Standish
Jourdan Lee Khoo as Harlan
Karina Sindicich as Lisa
Peer Metze as Luther Kobler
Tonya Cornelisse as Sky Bennett
Bjorn Turmann as Tobin
Remesh Panicker as Dr. Roshan Manik

Reception
The Guardian gave it a negative review saying "Humans in the middle of robo-armageddon should be a recipe for fun. But this does not compute".
Ain't it Cool News gave it a positive review saying "With some decent acting and some nicely done effects, there’s a lot to like about ROBOTROPOLIS despite its shortcomings."

Sequels
The plot of Robotropolis is continued in Battle of the Damned (2013).

References

External links

2010s English-language films